Kossoff Kirke Tetsu Rabbit is an album by guitarist Paul Kossoff, drummer Simon Kirke, bassist Tetsu Yamauchi and keyboard player John "Rabbit" Bundrick. The album was released in 1972.

Background
Recorded after Free disbanded, drummer Kirke elected to remain with guitar player Paul Kossoff forming a quartet with Bundrick and Yamauchi in 1971. Kirke has noted that although initially Kossoff appeared in good spirits and was engaged in making the album he increasingly indulged in drugs often falling asleep between takes or while listening to playbacks.

By April 1972 Free had reformed with Andy Fraser and Paul Rodgers making peace, and Kossoff appeared to pull it together if only briefly. Kossoff resumed taking drugs during the U.S. tour to support the last album by the original quartet Free at Last. On the eve of their Japanese tour Fraser fought with Rodgers and once again left the band, to be replaced by Yamauchi. Rodgers and Kirke elected to fill out the band bringing Bundrick on board as a member of Free for the tour and the last Free album Heartbreaker.

Although well received and filled with quality songwriting, "Kossoff Kirke Tetsu Rabbit" suffered from the lack of a strong lead vocalist like Rodgers. Kirke's song "Anna" was later re-recorded with Bad Company, the band that he and Rodgers established after the final breakup of Free. Also, "Hold On" was covered by Maggie Bell, which was included in the album "Suicide Sal".

The album was reissued in 2007 by Ork Records, a division of Cherry Red, in a remastered edition with a 12-page booklet featuring an interview with Bundrick.

Track listing
"Blue Grass" (Bundrick) – 5:21
"Sammy's Alright" (Bundrick) – 4:05
"Anna" (Kirke) – 3:39
"Just for the Box" (Kossoff) – 3:30
"Hold On" (Kirke, Kossoff) – 5:21
"Fool's Life" (Bundrick) – 4:29
"Yellow House" (Bundrick) – 3:23
"Dying Fire" (Kirke) – 4:29
"I'm on the Run" (Bundrick) – 4:33
"Colours" (Elliott Burgess, Kossoff) – 4:46

Personnel
Paul Kossoff – lead guitars, vocals on Colours
John "Rabbit" Bundrick – piano, electric piano, Mellotron, organ, vocals
Tetsu Yamauchi – bass guitar
Simon Kirke – drums, vocals

Additional personnel
B.J. Cole – steel guitar on tracks 7 & 9

Production
Produced by Paul Kossoff, Simon Kirke, Tetsu Yamauchi & John "Rabbit" Bundrick
Engineered By Richard Digby Smith and Tony Platt

References

1972 debut albums
Island Records albums
Paul Kossoff albums
Simon Kirke albums
Tetsu Yamauchi albums
John Bundrick albums
Collaborative albums